Zakalia Kote is a Burkinabé politician who served in the government of Burkina Faso as Minister of Justice from 2007 to 2011.

Kote worked as a magistrate for years before being appointed as Secretary-General of the Government and the Council of Ministers on January 6, 2006. Later, on June 10, 2007, he was appointed as Minister of Justice.

References

Living people
Justice ministers of Burkina Faso
Year of birth missing (living people)
21st-century Burkinabé people